Chryseobacterium koreense  is a bacterium from the genus of Chryseobacterium which has been isolated from fresh mineral water in Korea.

References

External links
Type strain of Chryseobacterium koreense at BacDive -  the Bacterial Diversity Metadatabase

koreense
Bacteria described in 2009